The 1998 Michigan Attorney General election was held on November 3, 1998. Democratic nominee Jennifer Granholm defeated Republican nominee John Smietanka with 52.09% of the vote.

General election

Candidates
Major party candidates
Jennifer Granholm, Democratic
John Smietanka, Republican

Results

References

Attorney General
Michigan Attorney General elections
November 1998 events in the United States
Michigan